The No. 101 Squadron  (Falcons) is an Indian Air Force fighter aircraft squadron which is equipped with the Dassault Rafale and is based at the Hasimara Air Force Station.

History
101 Squadron was formed with the specific role of photo reconnaissance. Enjoying the place of pride in the Squadron crest is a trained hunting Falcon, the bird's keen eyesight, quick and sure kill ability symbolizes the role for which the Squadron was formed.

The squadron was resurrected with Dassault Rafale in June 2021 and was inducted into Hasimara, West Bengal on 28 July 2021.

Present
The squadron was resurrected in June 2021 with 5 Dassault Rafale in Ambala. The squadron was commissioned in its designated base in Hasimara from 28 July 2021.

Assignments
 Indo-Pakistani War of 1965
 Indo-Pakistani War of 1971

Aircraft

Aircraft types operated by the squadron

Gallery

References

101